Uncle Maddio's Pizza Joint is a fast casual restaurant chain serving pizzas, salads and sandwiches with its headquarters in Atlanta, Georgia, United States.

History and growth
The first Uncle Maddio's Pizza Joint opened in 2009 in Atlanta. The chain currently has nearly 40 franchised units open in Georgia, Florida, Colorado, Alabama, Arkansas, South Carolina, North Carolina, North Dakota, and Tennessee, with additional locations announced for those states as well as Maryland, Iowa, Louisiana, Mississippi, Montana, and New Jersey.

Uncle Maddio's Pizza Joint was founded by CEO Matt Andrew, who was also a founder and former president of the Moe's Southwest Grill chain of Tex-Mex restaurants.  On April 13, 2019, Integrity Brands - the parent company of the Uncle Maddio's brand name - filed for bankruptcy.

See also
 List of pizza chains of the United States

References

External links
 

Fast casual restaurants
Pizza chains of the United States
Restaurant chains in the United States
Pizza franchises
Companies based in Atlanta
2009 establishments in Georgia (U.S. state)
Restaurants established in 2009